Tony Gustavsson (born 14 August 1973) is a Swedish professional football manager and former player who works as head coach of the Australia women's national team.

He is best known for his managerial success in women's football, leading Tyresö FF to the 2014 UEFA Women's Champions League Final and helping the United States women's national soccer team to two world championships in 2015 and 2019 as an assistant.

Management career

Early career in men's football
Gustavsson first managed Degerfors IF. He was then in charge of Hammarby IF from 2006 but was sacked when the club was relegated from the top flight in 2009.

On 27 April 2010, Gustavsson signed a 44-day contract with the Norwegian Tippeliga-club Kongsvinger IL, but he decided later on to stay till the end of the season. After being relegated with Kongsvinger, Gustavsson did not use his option to extend his contract by one year, and left the club.

Tyresö FF

Under Gustavsson's leadership Tyresö FF won their first Damallsvenskan title in 2012, after a dramatic last day win over rivals Malmö. Madelaine Edlund scored the winning goal after Caroline Seger's shot had hit the post.

Gustavsson also led Tyresö to a 4–3 defeat by Wolfsburg in the 2014 UEFA Women's Champions League Final. Tyresö became insolvent in 2014 and were kicked out of the 2014 Damallsvenskan season, expunging all their results and making all their players free agents. The Stockholm County Administrative Board published the employees' salaries, showing Gustavsson was among the higher earners at SEK 75 000 per-month.

United States women
In April 2012, Gustavsson joined the United States women's national soccer team as an assistant coach to compatriot Pia Sundhage.

Australia women
On 29 September 2020, he joined Australia women's national soccer team as the head coach.

Managerial statistics

References

External links

Hammarby Profile 

Living people
1974 births
People from Sundsvall
Swedish footballers
Association football forwards
Swedish football managers
Hammarby Fotboll managers
Hammarby Fotboll non-playing staff
Degerfors IF managers
Kongsvinger IL Toppfotball managers
Australia women's national soccer team managers
Swedish expatriate football managers
Swedish expatriate sportspeople in the United States
Expatriate soccer managers in the United States
Swedish expatriate sportspeople in Australia
Expatriate soccer managers in Australia
Sportspeople from Västernorrland County